Chalcosyrphus shirakii is a species of syrphid fly in the family Syrphidae.

Distribution
Japan.

References

Eristalinae
Insects described in 1985
Diptera of Asia